In French Labour Law a Dismissal is the breach of the employment contract by the employer. French Labour Law stipulates that an employment contract can be terminated by either of the parties. The 2008 reform of Labour Law introduced the possibility of a negotiated termination (voluntary termination of employment).

Types of Dismissal

In France the following types of dismissal are possible:
Dismissal for economic reasons (redundancy) - the dismissed person may not be replaced.
This type of dismissal can occur for the following reasons:
 Serious economic difficulty
 Technological change
 Organisational change 
 Liquidation of the company.
Dismissal linked to the employee - an employee dismissed will be replaced by another employee.
This covers the following areas:
 Not being able to do your job properly
 Due to serious differences with employer or colleagues
 Misconduct.

Compensation

Statutory Compensation
Statutory compensation is the legally binding minimum and may be replaced by a higher amount agreed between the employer and the employee representatives under a collective agreement. Employees who have held a position for more than 12 months are entitled to compensation for redundancy & dismissal (except if they have been dismissed for Gross Misconduct).

For example, a worker with a monthly salary of €1000 in his fifth year of employment would receive €1000 compensation.

Collective Compensation
This replaces the statutory minimum if it exists. It is tax-free and no payroll tax applies.

Claim for unfair dismissal or redundancy
An employment tribunal can overturn a dismissal or redundancy.
If you win your case, the tribunal can order the employer to do any of the following:
Pay compensation
Pay tribunal fees and witness expenses you've paid
Improve working conditions
give the employee their job back.

The amount of compensation can depend on the number of employees in the company and their length of service and salary.

Employees with special protection against dismissal and redundancy 

The following employees are afforded special protection immediately prior to, during and after (up to 12 months) their mandate.

 Employee representatives
 Union representatives
 Employees serving in employment tribunals or bankruptcy courts

See also
Redundancy in United Kingdom law
Unfair dismissal
Wrongful dismissal
Constructive dismissal

Notes

Termination of employment
Labour law
Employment in France